AmiKit is a compilation of 425 pre-installed and pre-configured Amiga programs (Amiga software built for Motorola 68k CPU) running on Windows, macOS, Linux computers.(thanks to WinUAE emulator) and on Amiga computer with Vampire V2 card.

Features 

 Besides original Workbench, AmiKit offers Directory Opus Magellan and Scalos as desktop replacements
 Includes 425 pre-installed and pre-configured Amiga programs (Tools, Utilities, Games and Demos) freely available from Aminet and other sources
"Rabbit Hole" feature allows to launch Windows, Mac or Linux applications directly from Amiga desktop
Supports HD Ready (720p) and FullHD (1080p) resolutions in 32-bit screen modes
Features TrueType fonts, DualPNG icons (by Ken Lester) and 24-bit visual themes (including Dark Mode, Modern Retro, etc.)
Dropbox and Google Drive support

Requirements 

AmiKit requires Vampire v2 turbo card (for classic Amiga) or Windows 7 (or better) or macOS (10.08 up to 10.14) or Linux (x86/64 able to run PlayOnLinux or Raspberry Pi).

For AmiKit to work, the original AmigaOS (version 3.x) and Kickstart ROM (version 3.1) are required. The following sources are supported:

 AmigaOS XL CD or ISO
 AmigaOS 3.9 CD or ISO (also available in Amiga Forever from Cloanto, including required Kickstart ROM)
 AmigaOS 3.5 CD or ISO
 AmigaOS 3.1 available on AmigaOS4.1 FE CD or ISO from Hyperion Entertainment (also includes required Kickstart ROM)
 AmigaOS 3.1.4 ZIP from Hyperion Entertainment (also includes required Kickstart ROM)
 AmigaOS 3.2 from Hyperion Entertainment (AmiKit for Vampire only)

See also 

 Amiga
 AmigaOS
 UAE (emulator)
 Emulator

External links 
 

Amiga